Melanie Scholtz is a South African born jazz singer, composer, dancer and visual artist who has performed with Wynton Marsalis, The Jazz at Lincoln Center Orchestra, and Hugh Masakela.

Early life
Scholtz was born in Cape Town South Africa into a musical family. She began classical piano lessons at the age of 5 and at 16 started her formal vocal training with soprano May Abrahams. From 1997-2000 Scholtz attended The University of Cape Town where she graduated Cum Laude with a Performers Diploma in Opera.

Career
After graduating from The University of Cape Town, Scholtz appeared on the 2001 South African Woman of the Year Awards show. The following year she returned to the South African Woman of the Year Awards Show with South African Music Award Winner, Mozambican guitarist Jimmy Dludlu, performing their hit single Peaceful Moment to which Melanie penned the lyric. In 2002 she won the Best Jazz Vocalist Award at the Old Mutual Jazz Encounters.

Scholtz released her debut album Zillion Miles in 2006. The album was produced by Thor Kvande and recorded at Paris Studios in Cape Town.

In 2010 Scholtz won the prestigious Standard Bank Artist Award. Her sophomore album Connected was produced by Ole Jørn Myklebust with whom Scholtz had previously toured and recorded with. That same year she also released Living Standards, her first endeavor recording traditional jazz material.

Scholtz released Freedom’s Child - Melanie Scholtz sings James Matthews in 2013. This collaboration with dissident, anti apartheid activist and poet James Mathews was produced by Mark Fransman and features saxophonist Soweto Kinch. The album spans 11 poems of Matthews from various anthologies set to Scholtz’s music. The same year Scholtz released Our Time produced by Bokani Dyer.

Scholtz moved to Czech Republic in 2015 and worked there as a songwriter while freelancing in Europe.

In 2017 Melanie moved to New York City and started working with the Jazz at Lincoln Centre organization as part of outreach workshops highlighting South African and American Jazz. She was featured as part of The Great South African Songbook Tour with Wynton Marsalis and The Jazz at Lincoln Center Orchestra, performing in New York, Chicago, Vienna and South Africa.

Discography

Albums As a Leader
 2006 - Zillion Miles 
 2010 - Connected
 2010 - Living Standards 
 2013 - Freedom Child 
 2013 - Our Time

Singles
 2005 - Goldfish, "Times May Change You", Caught In The Loop (Mango Music)
 2015 - Melanie Scholtz, Simple Melody
 2018 - Gratitude (with Sir LSG), Moving Circles

Selected Albums
 2001 - Jimmy Dludlu, Afrocentric (Universal Music)
 2009 - Ivan Mazuze, Maganda
 2010 - Inkala, Live in Varanger
 2011 - Sverre Gjørvad, Patience For The Little Things (Reflect)
 2011 - Marco Miro, Call Love, Muriel 
 2016 - Emilio Marinelli, Trio 4.0
 2018 - Marco Miro, You Love Me Anyway
 2018 - Special of the Day, The First Course

Awards
 2002 - Winner "Best Jazz Vocalist" Old Mutual Jazz Encounters
 2010 - Standard Bank Artist of the Year Award
 2012 - Jazz A Juan Revelations Festival in Juan Le Pins, Jury Prize, RTL prize and The Public Prize

References

External links
When Jazz and Poetry collide: Melanie Scholtz performs "Weave me a Fantasy"
MELANIE SCHOLTZ OUR TIME 2013
 Freedom's Child - Melanie Scholtz sings J. Matthews

21st-century South African women singers
Living people
People from Cape Town
Xhosa people
South African jazz singers
South African composers
South African College of Music alumni
1979 births